Dick Richards (born 1936) is an American film director, producer, and screenwriter. Known as a storyteller and an “actor’s director”, Richards  worked with Robert Mitchum, Gene Hackman, Martin Sheen, Blythe Danner, Catherine Deneuve, Alan Arkin and many others.

Career

Photography
Born and raised in New York, Richards rose to prominence during the 1960s advertising revolution, becoming a world-renowned photographer and commercial director with clients including Coca-Cola, Volkswagen, Polaroid, General Motors, Hertz, Pepsi, etc.

His celebrated advertising work  won every major industry award including the Cannes Lion for best worldwide commercial, as well as multiple Clio’s and New York Art Director Awards. Pauline Kael referred to Richards as “a photographer who became a whiz at TV commercials [before directing movies].”

Film
After years in the New York commercial world, Richards moved to Hollywood and directed his first feature film, The Culpepper Cattle Co. (1972), which was praised for its historical accuracy and period atmosphere. The film won Richards the WGA's Screen Writer's Annual Story Award and earned Jerry Bruckheimer his first film credit as associate producer. Richards and Bruckheimer, friends from their commercial days, went on to make three more movies together.

Richards' next film, Rafferty and the Gold Dust Twins (1975), starring Alan Arkin, McKenzie Phillips and Harry Dean Stanton, opened to positive reviews. In her book, Reeling, Pauline Kael calls Richards “A real southpaw” and said that, “Rafferty and the Gold Dust Twins sneaks up on you-you discover it like a ‘sleeper.’ I found it a funny, velvety film, with the kind of tenderness you can almost feel on your fingertips.”

That same year Richards directed Robert Mitchum and Charlotte Rampling in the Raymond Chandler adaptation, Farewell, My Lovely (1975). Roger Ebert said the movie “Never steps wrong” and called it “a totally assured piece of work.” Sylvia Miles earned a Best Supporting Actress Nomination. Sylvester Stallone also appears on screen in an early, pre-Rocky role. Film critic Rex Reed said, “Farewell, My Lovely is the kind of movie Humphrey Bogart would have stood in line to see.”

Richards went on to direct the British war drama March or Die (1977), starring Gene Hackman, Catherine Deneuve, and Terence Hill; the horror film Death Valley (1982); an adaptation of Erich Segal’s book by the same name, Man, Woman, and Child (1983), starring Martin Sheen and Blythe Danner; and Heat (1986), starring Burt Reynolds.

In 1983 Richards won the Golden Globe for Best Motion Picture - Comedy for Tootsie (1982), which he optioned, developed and produced with Sydney Pollack. The film was nominated for 10 Academy Awards (including a Best Picture nomination for Richards and Pollack). Roger Ebert gave the film 4 out of 4 stars praised the film as “the kind of Movie with a capital M that they used to make in the 1940s, when they weren’t afraid to mix up absurdity with seriousness, social comment with farce, and a little heartfelt tenderness right in there with the laughs.” In 1998, the United States Library of Congress deemed the film “culturally significant” and selected it for preservation in the National Film Registry.

Filmography

References

External links 

Personal website

American film producers
American film directors
1936 births
Living people
Golden Globe Award-winning producers